Bich may refer to:

Surname:
Albino Bich (1901–?), Italian skier, competitor in the 1924 Winter Olympics (military patrol)
Ivan Bich (born 1993), Russian pair skater
Marcel Bich (1914–1994), manufacturer and co-founder of Bic, the world's leading producer of ballpoint pens

Given name:
Bich Minh Nguyen (born 1974), American novelist
Bui Bich Phuong (born 1971), crowned Miss Vietnam in 1988
Luong Bich Huu, born September 1, 1984, is a Vietnamese actress and singer of Chinese ancestry
Ngoc Bich Ngan, (Mỹ Tho, 16 September 1973), is a Vietnamese-Canadian singer, songwriter, artist and writer
Nguyễn Quang Bích (1832–1890), Vietnamese poet
Nguyễn Thị Bích (1830–1909), Vietnamese poet
Tran Bich San (born 1940), famous Vietnamese writer, philosopher, and intellectual

Other:
Bich 10 or Ten-string guitar, including both electric and acoustic guitars
Bich-poo or Poodle crossbreed, purebred poodles that have been crossbred with another purebred dog breed
Kali Bich, a name for Potassium dichromate

See also
Bich Dong, capital of Việt Yên District, Bac Giang Province, Vietnam
Bich Sơn
Biche
Bicheh
Biches
Bitch (disambiguation)
Bitche
Bitsch (disambiguation)